The Rivière des Galets is a river on the Indian Ocean island of Réunion. It rises on the western slopes of Le Gros Morne, flowing northwest to reach the sea at Le Port after 36.2 km.

References

Rivers of Réunion
Rivers of France